is a song recorded by Japanese singer Misia, from the album Love Bebop. It was released as the album's lead single digitally on February 4, 2015, through Ariola Japan. It was released as a limited double A-side CD single alongside the song "Sakura Hitohira" a week later, on February 18, 2015. The song was co-written by her0ism and Yuuki Idei, and arranged and produced by her0ism. The song is featured as theme song on the soundtrack of the EX drama series Second Love starring Kazuya Kamenashi and Kyoko Fukada. The limited physical release includes a piano rendition of "Shiroi Kisetsu" as a hidden track.

Background and release
On January 22, a trailer for the single was uploaded on Misia's official YouTube channel. The single features three B-sides: the Shiro Sagisu-produced "Mayonaka no Hide-and-seek", "Candle of Life", which Misia first performed during the 2014 installment of her Misia Candle Night concert series, and lastly a remix of the latter track. The CD single cover artwork was designed by longtime collaborator Mitsuo Shindō and photographed by Kristian Schmidt.

Composition
"Shiroi Kisetsu" is written in the key of B-flat major with a common time tempo of 78 beats per minute. Misia's vocals span from F3 to D5 in modal voice, and up to E5 in head voice.

Chart performance
"Shiroi Kisetsu" debuted at number 7 on the weekly RecoChoku Singles chart. The CD single made its debut at number 24 on the Oricon Singles Chart, with 4,000 copies sold in its first charting week. It charted for nine consecutive weeks and sold a reported total of 9,000 copies.

Track listing

Credits and personnel
Personnel

 Vocals, backing vocals – Misia
 Songwriting – her0ism, Yuuki Idei
 Arrangement, programming, all other instruments – her0ism
 Electronic keyboard – Chris Rob
 Drums – Lil' John Roberts
 Bass – Nathan Watts
 Guitar – Errol Cooney
 Mixing – Tony Maserati
 Engineering – Masahiro Kawaguchi, Raheem Amlani
 Mastering – Herb Powers Jr.

Charts

References

External links

2015 singles
2015 songs
Misia songs
Japanese television drama theme songs
Song recordings produced by her0ism
Ariola Japan singles
Songs written by Her0ism